Attack of the Cybermen is the first serial of the 22nd season of the British science fiction television series Doctor Who, which was first broadcast in two weekly parts on 5 and 12 January 1985. It was credited to the pseudonymous author "Paula Moore"; there are conflicting accounts concerning to whom this credit belongs. Beginning with this serial and continuing for the remainder of Season 22, episodes were 45 minutes in length (as opposed to previous episodes which were 25 minutes long); for syndication, in some markets, this serial is re-edited into four 25-minute segments.

Attack of the Cybermen has a complex plot which reiterates narratives from The Tenth Planet (1966) and The Tomb of the Cybermen (1967). Set in London in 1985 and the planet Telos in the future, in the serial the Cybermen intend to change the course of history by destroying Earth with Halley's Comet in 1985, which would prevent the destruction of the Cybermen's original home planet Mondas. In addition to its contemporary London setting, it also features several other references to the previous season's Resurrection of the Daleks, notably the return of Lytton (played by Maurice Colbourne) and his henchmen (who again masquerade as policemen), and is directed by Matthew Robinson in his second and final contribution to the series.

Plot

Part One
In the sewers of London, two workers are attacked by an unseen force. The Sixth Doctor's attempts to repair the TARDIS's systems, in particular the chameleon circuit, which enables the ship to alter its external form to something more suitable than the police box, cause the ship to behave chaotically in-flight. The Doctor eventually manages to pilot the TARDIS to Earth in the year 1985, where he shows Halley's Comet to Peri, although she is more worried about the prospect of crashing into it.

On Earth, the former Dalek mercenary Lytton (from Resurrection of the Daleks) has apparently taken up a new life as a London gangster, and is plotting a £10 million diamond raid with his cohorts Griffiths, Payne and Russell. They intend to enter the bank through the same sewers where the workmen were ambushed, but Lytton activates a strange transmitter before they enter. This emits a distress signal that the Doctor picks up, and he lands the TARDIS in a scrapyard in Totter's Lane to investigate. The TARDIS changes shape, to a rather conspicuous ornamental dresser. After searching the area, he determines that the transmitter is a dummy, and returns to the TARDIS to find the real source. They arrive at the sewer entrance (where the TARDIS reshapes itself into an organ) and find the transmitter, but are held up by two policemen who are under Lytton's control.

In the sewers, Payne falls behind the other three, and is beaten to death by the force that attacked the workers. Lytton and the others come to a dead end, and find a Cyberman approaching them. Griffiths shoots it, but Lytton disarms him and surrenders to the Cybermen, who have a base in the sewers. Russell flees, encounters the Doctor and Peri, and reveals himself to be an undercover police officer who is investigating Lytton.

On the Cybermen's adopted homeworld of Telos, two slaves, Bates and Stratton, escape from their work party and decapitate a Cyberman. They use its helmet to disguise Stratton as a Cyberman and enter Cyber Control. The Cybermen have captured a time-travelling vessel from Bates and Stratton, who intend to reclaim it and escape from Telos.

The Doctor, Peri and Russell return to the TARDIS, where they are ambushed by the Cybermen, who have brought Lytton and Griffiths with them. Russell manages to kill two of them, but is then killed himself, and the Cyber Leader orders the other Cybermen to kill Peri.

Part Two
The Doctor threatens to self-destruct the TARDIS if the Cybermen do not release Peri. The Leader agrees to spare her, and reveals that the Cyber Controller (whom the Doctor had previously thought destroyed in the events of the serial The Tomb of the Cybermen) is still alive on Telos. The Doctor is forced to set a course for Telos, and is imprisoned in one of the TARDIS's rooms along with Peri, Lytton and Griffiths. During the journey he tells Peri and Griffiths the history of Telos and its former inhabitants, the Cryons, whom the Cybermen wiped out in order to use their refrigerated cities to keep themselves in cryogenic stasis. The Doctor notes that Lytton seems oddly familiar with the history of the Cybermen, Telos and the Cryons.

On Telos, most of the hibernating Cybermen have become damaged, and go on a rampage destroying anything in their path when revived. The TARDIS arrives, but in the depths of the Cybermen's cryogenic tombs rather than in Cyber Control. Just as the Cybermen prepare to take the four there, a damaged Cyberman breaks out of its tomb and destroys another Cyberman, before the leader disposes of it. Lytton, Griffiths and Peri escape in the confusion, but the Doctor does not. Peri is nearly killed by another rampaging Cyberman before two Cryons – who it turns out are not extinct, and have been sabotaging the tombs, resulting in the damaged Cybermen – deal with it and take Peri to safety. Lytton and Griffiths meet another Cryon, and it transpires that Lytton has been working for them all along. Griffiths is offered £2 million in diamonds (which are very common on Telos) if he will help Lytton to capture the time vessel. The two track down Bates and Stratton, who, after failed attempts at Cyber-conversion, have had their arms and legs replaced by mechanical equivalents. The four agree to work together to escape Telos.

The Doctor is imprisoned in a cold storage room with Flast, former leader of the Cryons. She reveals that the Cybermen intend to prevent their original homeworld of Mondas from being destroyed, by using their timeship to divert Halley's Comet into the Earth, which will then be incapable of protecting itself from an attack by Mondas in 1986. The Doctor is shocked to realise that he has been sent by the Time Lords to avert this situation. The cold storage room contains a supply of vastial, a mineral that becomes a powerful explosive when raised significantly above freezing point. The Doctor uses some to dispose of a guarding Cyberman, then gives Flast a sonic lance to heat up the vastial to detonation point before he escapes. Flast puts the sonic lance in a box of vastial which she hides; shortly afterward the Cybermen arrive and, suspecting that she helped the Doctor escape, throw her out into the much warmer corridor, where her blood quickly boils away and she dies.

Lytton, Griffiths, Bates and Stratton get through Cyber Control, but Lytton is captured. The Cyber Controller demands that Lytton tell him his plans, and when he refuses to do so, has two other Cybermen torture him by crushing his hands. Lytton still refuses to talk, and the Controller orders that he be converted into a Cyberman. The other three make it to the landing pad, but a Cyberman emerges from the time ship and kills them. The Doctor reclaims the TARDIS and the Cryons return Peri to him. However, they reveal that Lytton was working for them all along, rather than the Cybermen as the Doctor assumed, and he agrees to try to save him.

The TARDIS arrives in Cyber Control where the Doctor finds a partially converted Lytton who begs the Doctor to kill him. The Doctor tries to free him, but the Controller arrives with a gun. Lytton attacks the Controller, who kills Lytton. The Cyber Leader and his lieutenant arrive, but end up killing each other in the crossfire. The Doctor grabs a gun and shoots the Controller, finally destroying it. After Peri convinces the Doctor that he can do nothing to save Lytton, the two escape in the TARDIS. Seconds later the rigged box of vastial detonates, setting off a chain reaction of explosions that obliterates Cyber Control and the tombs. The Doctor remarks that he misjudged Lytton terribly.

Production
The repair to the Chameleon Circuit was in part a publicity effort by John Nathan-Turner to drum up more interest in the series. He hinted publicly that it might be a permanent development, but never pursued the idea beyond this story. According to Patrick Mulkern of Radio Times, the director, Matthew Robinson, "fought the lighting crew to keep the sewer scenes dark and effectively creepy" and had the idea of changing the Cryons from male to female. Music cues by Malcolm Clarke from Earthshock were reused to establish the presence of the Cybermen.

Authorship
The serial is credited to Paula Moore, an alias for Paula Woolsey. Several separate accounts offer differing versions of who actually authored the story. Most accounts agree that series fan and continuity advisor Ian Levine suggested a number of plot elements. At one extreme, it is suggested that the story was authored by series script editor Eric Saward, with or without substantial input by Levine, with Woolsey only acting as the story's author to prevent problems with the Writers' Guild of Great Britain, who objected to script editors editing their own scripts. Alternatively, it is suggested that Woolsey originated the story, but that Saward heavily rewrote it in his capacity as script editor. Levine claims that Saward wrote the dialogue to Levine's story and plot, and that Woolsey "did not write one single word of that script". In a 2004 interview with Doctor Who Magazine, Saward responded that he "effectively" wrote the script himself, incorporating Levine's story outline, with a "minor contribution" from Woolsey.

Broadcast and reception

Episode One achieved the highest viewing figures of any Sixth Doctor episode, at 8.9 million viewers. No other story reached 8 million or above for the remainder of Baker's run.

Attack of the Cybermen was the first of several stories from this season to provoke controversy over its depiction of violence. In 1985, Australasian Doctor Who Fan Club president Tony Howe singled out the crushing of Lytton's hands until they oozed blood as being an instance of "sick, shock violence like Andy Warhol's" that was present for "cheap shock value only". Doctor Who: The Television Companion'''s own review of the story is similarly critical of the scene, describing it as a "gratuitous incident" which is "unnecessarily nasty and gory". It acknowledges some "saving graces", including Matthew Robinson's "polished direction" and Maurice Colbourne's return, who "manages to give a boost to every scene in which he appears", but states the story is "superficially exciting but it does not stand up to considered scrutiny or repeated viewing", describing it as "one of the most derivative stories that Doctor Who ever turned out".

For Den of Geek in 2010, Rob Hill ranked Attack of the Cybermen at number six in "the top 10 Cybermen stories", describing it as "a guilty pleasure, much like Hollyoaks, Neighbours, or even spying on your neighbours. And who couldn't love it? It's just so kitsch!" He added, "This story, if you do not have a working knowledge of the previous twenty-two years of Doctor Who continuity, makes as good as no sense whatsoever", with almost "no effort made to give the viewer any backstory." He also described the plot as "almost a rehash" of The Tomb of the Cybermen and thought Lytton's "motives" were "completely inscrutable and unclear right up until the end." Patrick Mulkern of Radio Times reviewed the story in 2012, awarding it two stars out of five and stating "Attack of the Cybermen is nowhere near as wretched as I remembered it. Part one is markedly more eventful and involving than part two, but there's plenty of amusing lines and well-shot action." Mulkern was critical of aspects of Peri's character and Nicola Bryant's inexperience as an actress, but enjoyed a "never less than entertaining, and often very funny" performance by Colin Baker. The review concluded by stating "on balance Attack of the Cybermen is a brash start to season 22 that would benefit from another polish."

In the book Doctor Who: The Episode Guide, Mark Campbell awarded it three out of ten, describing it as "badly written and continuity-obsessed, with a predilection towards needless violence."

Commercial releases

In print

A novelisation of this serial, written by Eric Saward, was published by Target Books in April 1989.

The novel was also issued by BBC Audio in 1995 as an abridged audio book, read by Colin Baker.

Home mediaAttack of the Cybermen was released on VHS in November 2000 from BBC Video as "Doctor Who: The Cybermen Box Set: The Tenth Planet and Attack of the Cybermen" double-tape set for its United Kingdom release (both stories were released individually in the United States, Australia and Canada in 2001). The DVD version of "Attack of the Cybermen" was released on Monday 16 March 2009. The special features on the disc included a commentary featuring Colin Baker, Nicola Bryant, Terry Molloy and Sarah Berger that was recorded on 26 June 2007, a making-of documentary featuring interviews with cast and crew, including Eric Saward, Matthew Robinson and film cameraman Godfrey Johnson, and an interview featuring real-life Cyberman Kevin Warwick. This serial was also released as part of the Doctor Who DVD Files in Issue 82 on 22 February 2012.

References

Further reading
Howe, D, Stammers M, Walker, S The Handbook: The Sixth Doctor'' (1993) Doctor Who Books (Virgin Publishing)

External links

Attack of the Cybermen – the Unseen Version in Time Space Visualiser

Reviews

Target novelisation

On Target – Attack of the Cybermen

1985 British television episodes
Cybermen television stories
Doctor Who serials novelised by Eric Saward
Doctor Who stories set on Earth
Fiction about Halley's Comet
Fiction set in 1985
Sixth Doctor serials
Television episodes set in London